Armenia Time (AMT) is a time zone used in Armenia. Armenia Time is four hours ahead of UTC at UTC+04:00.

Clock time is about one hour later than solar noon in Armenia. Consequently, population activity hours are similar to those in Paris or Barcelona, which have about the same shift to solar time. They are about one hour later compared to those in Berlin and Vienna, and are two hours later than those in Warsaw and New York.

Daylight saving time
Armenia does not utilize Daylight saving time. The Government of Armenia issued a decree that cancelled the observance of daylight saving time, otherwise known as Armenia Summer Time (AMST) in 2012.

Other time zones in UTC +4

Some time zones exist that have the same offset as AMT, but can be found under a different name in other countries, these include:
Georgia Time
Azerbaijan Time
Gulf Standard Time
Mauritius Time
United Arab Emirates Standard Time
Réunion Time Zone
Samara Time
Seychelles Time

Artsakh
The partially recognized state of the Republic of Artsakh also uses Armenia Time (AMT).

See also
 Lists of time zones
 Time in Europe

References

External links
http://www.world-time-zones.org/zones/armenia-time.htm 
http://www.worldtimezone.com/wtz-names/wtz-amst.html

Communications in Armenia
Time zones